Andy Warhol Foundation for the Visual Arts, Inc. v. Goldsmith (Docket 21–869) is a pending U.S. Supreme Court case dealing with the transformative nature of fair use under U.S. copyright law. The case deals with the Prince Series created by Andy Warhol based on a photograph by Lynn Goldsmith of the musician Prince, and questions whether Warhol's changes were sufficiently transformative from Goldsmith to fall within fair use, an issue arising from a circuit split between the Second and Ninth Circuits among others.

Background 

In 1981 photographer Lynn Goldsmith took a series of photographs of Prince at the start of his musical career. Following the release of Prince's Purple Rain in 1984, the magazine Vanity Fair, a Condé Nast publication, licensed a single black and white full length photograph of Prince for a planned feature and it was agreed the photograph would be used as an "artistic reference". Vanity Fair then commissioned pop-art artist Andy Warhol, who created a cropped, highly colorized painting using just Prince’s head from the photograph.  The painting illustrated the feature entitled "Purple Fame". Goldsmith received a co-credit for the illustration.

Warhol created 16 variants of the Prince portrait between 1984 and his death in 1987, collectively known as the Prince Series, including the notable Orange Prince variant that was completed in 1984. All of 16 works remained in Warhol's private collection whilst he was alive and after his death were managed by the Andy Warhol Foundation for the Visual Arts (AWF). The Prince Series works have been exhibited many times in museum shows and galleries around the world including the Museum of Modern Art, Tate and The Andy Warhol Museum.

After Prince's death in 2016, Condé Nast published a commemorative magazine looking back on Prince’s life with one of the Prince Series variants as the cover image. Despite licensing the photograph and the co- credit in Vanity Fair, Goldsmith alleged that she had been unaware of the existence of the illustration and the Prince Series until 2016, over 30 years later when she saw the Condé Nast cover. Condé Nast credited the Foundation and did not mention her.

Goldsmith informed the Foundation that she believed these additional works were copyright violations of her photograph and stated her intent to seek legal action. The Foundation filed for a preliminary ruling in the Southern District of New York, stating in court papers that it felt like a "shakedown".  Federal judge John G. Koeltl granted motion for the Foundation in 2019 to block further litigation from Goldsmith. Koeltl ruled that Warhol had transformed Goldsmith's original photograph under fair use as to show the change of Prince "from a vulnerable, uncomfortable person to an iconic, larger-than-life figure".

Goldsmith appealed to the Second Circuit, which reversed Koeltl's judgement in March 2021 and allowing Goldsmith's lawsuit to proceed. In their opinion, the Second Circuit wrote that Koeltl erred in his judgment, with Judge Gerard E. Lynch writing "The district judge should not assume the role of art critic and seek to ascertain the intent behind or meaning of the works at issue. That is so both because judges are typically unsuited to make aesthetic judgments and because such perceptions are inherently subjective." Lynch continued that it was clear the Prince Series derived from Goldsmith's photograph, and that the fair use defense for transformative works failed because Warhol's work "retains the essential elements of the Goldsmith photograph without significantly adding to or altering those elements." The Foundation have claimed that Lynch undermines his own argument in the ruling, that a judge should not play art critic.

Supreme Court 

The Andy Warhol Foundation petitioned to the Supreme Court to challenge the Second Circuit's ruling. The Foundation stated that the Second Circuit's ruling was "a sea-change in the law of copyright" and would cast "a cloud of legal uncertainty over an entire genre of visual art."

AWF claims the Second Circuit’s decision subverts the entire purpose of copyright law: to promote creative progress. As argued by AWF, the Second Circuit's insistence that its "conclusion that those images are closer to what the law deems 'derivative' (and not 'transformative') does not imply that the Prince Series (or Warhol’s art more broadly) is 'derivative', in the pejorative artistic sense, of Goldsmith’s work or of anyone else's" is disingenuous and could create a chilling effect. Under the Second Circuit’s logic, as claimed by AWF, an artist like Warhol would be chilled from creating a similar work today in fear of facing claims of infringement, which, under the AWF standard, would be upheld.

At the heart of AWF's petition was to address the circuit split on the matter of transformative works under fair use provisions created by the Second Circuit, particularly with the Ninth Circuit where most fair use defense cases have been heard and which supported the district court's treatment of transformative works. The Foundation also identified the Supreme Court's decision in Google LLC v. Oracle America, Inc. (2021) related to fair use and transformation that supported the district court's position.

In Goldsmith's filings, it is argued that the Second Circuit's decision is not as dire for copyright as the Foundation has claimed, and that they have "taken a Chicken-Little approach to the decision below, but the sky is not remotely close to falling.

The Supreme Court granted certiorari for the case in March 2022, to be heard during the Court's 2022–2023 term. The Court will decide whether Warhol, under fair use doctrine, "meaningfully transformed" the original black and white photo of Prince to create new works of art, the paintings and drawings of Prince.

The U.S. Copyright Office in its amicus brief sided with Goldsmith in that Warhol's works were not fair use, as they did not create new expressive meaning, and that a ruling in favor of Warhol would "dramatically expand copyists' ability to appropriate existing works".

References 

United States copyright case law
United States Supreme Court cases
Prince (musician)
Andy Warhol